US Post Office-Ilion is a historic post office building located at Ilion in Herkimer County, New York, United States. It was built in 1935–36, and is one of a number of post offices in New York State designed by the Office of the Supervising Architect of the Treasury Department, Louis A. Simon.   It is a one-story, seven bay, steel frame building on a raised foundation with a brick watercourse in the Colonial Revival style. The interior features a 1937 plaster relief by artist Edmond Amateis of Eliphalet Remington.

It was listed on the National Register of Historic Places in 1989.

References

Ilion
Government buildings completed in 1936
Colonial Revival architecture in New York (state)
Buildings and structures in Herkimer County, New York
National Register of Historic Places in Herkimer County, New York